Blood and Steel is a 1959 American drama film directed by Bernard L. Kowalski and written by Joseph C. Gilette. The film stars John Lupton, James Edwards, Brett Halsey, John Brinkley, Allen Jung and Ziva Rodann. The film was released on December 30, 1959, by 20th Century Fox.

It was also known as Condemened Patrol.

Plot
A native girl helps US Seabees free her villagers from Japanese troops. In 1943 a recon patrol of four CBs is sent to Gizo Island in the Southwest Pacific. Their objective is to find out whether the small island is suitable for building an airfield after an American landing operation. They face a small Japanese force that enjoys the insignificance of their post and sake. The only black GI hurts his leg and hides in the jungle. He is discovered by the young native woman (for some reason in a tight skirt). She helps him to hide and he is able to blow up the Japanese "headquarters". Finally the patrol loses one man and has to leave the girl behind as they embark on their small raft.

Cast 
John Lupton as Lieutenant Dave Jenson
James Edwards as George
Brett Halsey as Jim
John Brinkley as Cip 
Allen Jung as Japanese Commander
Ziva Rodann as Native Girl
James Hong as Japanese Draftsman
Bill Saito as Sugi
Clarence Lung as Japanese Soldier

References

Notes
The movie title can be seen in a 1958 Felix the Cat cartoon (The Hairy Berry Bush, ep. 55) at about the 1:35 mark, where Rock Bottom is reading a newspaper, which apparently, was a snippet of the actual newsprint inserted into the animation.

External links 
 
Blood and Steel at TCMDB

1959 films
20th Century Fox films
1950s war drama films
Films directed by Bernard L. Kowalski
Pacific War films
American black-and-white films
American war drama films
1959 drama films
1950s English-language films
1950s American films